Brett Allen Scallions (born December 21, 1971) is an American singer. He is best known for being the original lead vocalist and rhythm guitarist for the alternative rock band Fuel from 1993 to 2006 and then from 2010 to 2020.During that time, the band released four major-label albums including the double platinum Something Like Human. His initial stint with the band ended in February 2006.
 Scallions has been ranked in the Top 100 Heavy Metal Vocalists by Hit Parader (#50).

Early life
Scallion was born in Brownsville, Tennessee. As a child, he listened to Elvis records. He would sing in choir in church and was cast as lead actor in plays throughout his high school. He was awarded scholarships to Lambuth University for music and theater.

Career

Fuel 
Scallions joined Fuel in 1993 after bassist Jeff Abercrombie saw him perform in a bar in Jackson, Tennessee. The band achieved its greatest success with Scallions as lead singer. Scallions later moved to Harrisburg, Pennsylvania with the rest of the band where they would perform at local bars and nightclubs under the name Real 2 Reel.

World Fire Brigade 
Outside Re-Fueled, Scallions was busy with Sean Danielsen of Smile Empty Soul and producer Eddie Wohl, writing and recording an album under the name World Fire Brigade. "It's much heavier than anything I ever did with Fuel," Scallions said of World Fire Brigade's sound in August 2009. "We've done a lot of stuff in lower tones which is a first for me also, it's very deep, heavy, and even growly at times." He also said that the World Fire Brigade album was "almost three-quarters of the way complete, and planned to be released early next spring, fingers crossed". Two new tracks "Shot Down" and "Take Me Away" were available on MySpace since March 2011. The album is currently available for streaming through Riptide Music website (under working title Weight of the World).

The debut album titled Spreading My Wings was released by FrostByte Media Inc. on August 28, 2012.

The World Fire Brigade line-up consisted of Scallions (vocals/guitar), Sean Danielsen (vocals/guitar), and Eddie Wohl (keyboards). Guest musicians on the album included former Candiria drummer Ken Schalk, Mike McCready (Pearl Jam), Rob Caggiano (Anthrax), and Andy Andersson (Black Robot). Brad Stewart had been announced as the group's touring bassist. Even though he recorded bass tracks for the album, Scallions had stated that he will be playing rhythm guitar when the group goes on tour.

On April 3, 2013, the following message was posted on the World Fire Brigade Facebook page:

"Thanks to everyone that has discovered our music and has questions about touring and new music. Right now we're all too busy with our other bands to tour, but that doesn't mean it will never happen." The post went on to invite fans to support the bands Fuel and Smile Empty Soul "on the road all year".

Post-Fuel / other projects

After leaving Fuel, Scallions joined bands with The X's and Circus Diablo playing bass. Both bands ultimately became one-album projects and concluded shortly after subsequent tours.

In March 2007, Scallions was selected as the lead singer for Riders on the Storm, a project featuring former members of The Doors, Robby Krieger and Ray Manzarek.

Brett Scallions contributed lead vocals to the charity single "Something to Believe", released by the band Hollow on iTunes via Koch Records on March 9, 2010.

Departure and return to Fuel
Scallions left Fuel in early 2006. According to an interview with Alternative Addition, Scallions cited the reason due to the band becoming a "one-man band" throughout the years. The three remaining members of the band, however, chose to continue with new vocalist Toryn Green. With Green, Fuel would record one unsuccessful album, 2007's Angels & Devils and would largely be inactive by 2008 due to legal issues with their then-label Epic Records.

During Fuel's inactivity, Scallions and bassist Jeff Abercrombie teamed up for the first time since Scallions' departure in 2006 to tour as "Re-Fueled". Scallions and Abercrombie recruited guitarist Yogi Lonich of Chris Cornell and Buckcherry fame and drummer Ken Schalk, formerly of Candiria to round out the unit. Their debut performance was a free event that took place on August 28, 2009 at the Tempe Marketplace, playing songs from the Sunburn and Something Like Human albums exclusively.

Still without word from the official incarnation of Fuel and with Re-Fueled increasing its tour schedule, speculation surrounding the future for Fuel began to increase including some confusion on the part of vocalist Toryn Green. Green explained he had not heard anything from the other members, but expressed his support for seeing Scallions back on stage singing classic Fuel songs again.  Finally, On April 8, 2010, it was announced that Re-Fueled had disbanded, and that original guitarist/songwriter Carl Bell, and bassist Jeff Abercrombie had left Fuel to pursue other endeavors. Toryn Green and drummer Tommy Stewart left the band as well. On the same day, Brett Scallions reformed Fuel with Lonich, Schalk, and former Shinedown bassist Brad Stewart.

A couple of new songs worked their way into Fuel's live sets between 2010 and 2013, beginning with a track titled "Headache", and in March 2012 it was announced that Fuel intended to release a new album, which would be the first Fuel contribution to include Scallions since 2003's Natural Selection. By the end of April 2013, tracking for the new album had been completed and the band promised that a new single was soon to come.

On December 5, 2013, the first new track from the forthcoming Puppet Strings album was unveiled, and the first official single was set for a January 2014 release with the album release to follow on March 4.

In June 2014, the album release was followed-up with the song "Cold Summer" being released as a single. Scallions has stated that he penned the song during his original tenure in Fuel, somewhere around 2002. Originally known as "Hit and Sorry", he recalls having recorded it so many times he almost gave up on the track. After adding a new chorus with contributions from producer Eddie Wohl and consulting the opinions of his bandmates, the decision was made to include the song on the album.

In 2015, Scallions embarked on his first unplugged tour. He performed Fuel songs as well as covering some of his favorite songs that were seminal in his musical journey.

Scallions again chose to leave Fuel after internal conflicts with original bandmates arose in October 2020.

Personal life
Scallions is married to Abby Gennet, guitarist and lead singer of Slunt. They have two sons together; born 2007 and 2010.

References

Fuel (band) members
Alternative metal musicians
American rock singers
People from Brownsville, Tennessee
1971 births
Living people
21st-century American singers
21st-century American male singers